Tin House is an American book publisher based in Portland, Oregon, and New York City. Portland publisher Win McCormack originally conceived the idea for a literary magazine called Tin House in the summer of 1998. He enlisted Holly MacArthur as managing editor and developed the magazine with the help of two experienced New York editors, Rob Spillman and Elissa Schappell.

In 2005, Tin House expanded into the book division, Tin House Books. They also began to run a by-admission-only summer writers' workshop held at Reed College.

In December 2018, Tin House announced that they were shuttering their literary magazine after 20 years to focus on their book releases and workshops. 

Tin House published fiction, essays, and poetry, as well as interviews with important literary figures, a "Lost and Found" section dedicated to exceptional and generally overlooked books, "Readable Feast" food writing features, and "Literary Pilgrimages", about visits to the homes of writing greats. It was also distinguished from many other notable literary magazines by actively seeking work from previously unpublished writers to feature as "New Voices".

Tin House was honored by major American literary awards and anthologies, particularly for its fiction. A story from the Summer 2003 issue, "Breasts" by Stuart Dybek, was featured in The Best American Short Stories for 2004, and in 2006, "Window" by Deborah Eisenberg was a "juror favorite" in The O. Henry Prize Stories.

The magazine was closed after the release of its June 2019 20th-anniversary issue.

Staff 
 Publisher and Editor-in-Chief: Win McCormack
 Editor: Rob Spillman
 Art Director: Diane Chonette
 Deputy Publisher: Holly Macarthur
 Managing Editor: Cheston Knapp
 Executive Editor: Michelle Wildgen
 Senior Editor: Emma Komlos-Hrobsky
 Editor-at-Large: Elissa Schappell
 Associate Editor: Thomas Ross
 Poetry Editor: Camille T. Dungy
 Senior Designer: Jakob Vala
 Paris Editor: Heather Hartley
 Copy Editors: Meg Storey and Jess Kibler

Writers whose work has appeared in Tin House 

 Chris Adrian
 Sherman Alexie
 Dorothy Allison
 Steve Almond
 Yehuda Amichai
 Rebecca Aronson
 Tom Barbash
 Charles Baxter
 Aimee Bender
 Sarah Shun-lien Bynum
 Lucy Corin
 Ariel Dorfman

 Stuart Dybek
 Deborah Eisenberg
 Faiz Ahmed Faiz
 Richard Ford
 William Gay
 Allan Gurganus
 Seamus Heaney
 Ann Hood
 Bret Anthony Johnston
 Miranda July
 Yasunari Kawabata
 James Kelman

 William Keohane
 Stephen King
 Phil Klay
 Stanley Kunitz
 Kelly Le Fave
 Jonathan Lethem
 Kelly Link
 Patricia Lockwood
 Rick Moody
 Alice Munro
 Pablo Neruda
 Sharon Olds

 Dawn Powell
 Peter Rock
 Marilynne Robinson
 Karen Russell
 Edward W. Said
 James Salter
 John Sanford
 Charles Simic
 Donna Tartt
 Quincy Troupe
 Danielle Trussoni
 David Foster Wallace

Tin House Books

Staff
 Senior Editor: Masie Cochran
 Senior Editor: Tony Perez
 Assistant Editor: Elizabeth DeMeo
 Director of Marketing & Rights: Nanci McCloskey
 Director of Publicity: Molly Templeton
 Publicity and Marketing Assistant: Yashwina Canter
 Art Director: Diane Chonette
 Senior Designer: Jakob Vala
 Designer: Jeremy Cruz

Books published

 Best of Tin House (2006). 
 Do Me: Tales of Sex and Love from Tin House (2007). 
 Food and Booze: A Tin House Literary Feast (2006). 
 The World Within (2007). 
 Arnold-Ratliff, Katie. Bright Before Us (2011). 
 Becker, Geoffrey. Hot Springs (2010). 
 Beha, Christopher. What Happened to Sophie Wilder (2012). 978-1935639312
 Bogan, Louis, trans. and ed. The Journal of Jules Renard (2008). 
 Boren, Karen Lee. Girls in Peril (2006). 
 Braver, Adam. "November 22, 1963" (2008). 
 Corin, Lucy. The Entire Predicament (2007). 
 DeVoto, Bernard. The Hour: A Cocktail Manifesto (2010). 
 Erens, Pamela. The Virgins (2013). 
 Fasenfest, Harriet. A Householder's Guide to the Universe (2010). 
 Freed, Dolly. Possum Living: How to Live Well Without a Job and With (Almost) No Money (2010). 
 Fuller, Claire. Our Endless Numbered Days (2015). 
 Goldfaden, Josh. Human Resources (2006). 
 Grimes, Tom. Mentor: A Memoir (2010). 
 Hallman, J. C. ed. The Story About the Story: Great Writers Explore Great Literature (2009). 
 Harvey, Matthea, illustrated by Zechel, Elizabeth. The Little General and The Giant Snowflake (2009). 
 Heyns, Michiel, introduction by A. L. Kennedy. "The Children's Day" (2009). 
 Hirvonen, Elina. "When I Forgot" (2009). 
 Hunt, Samantha. "The Seas" (2018). 
 Krusoe, Jim. "Erased." (2009) 
 Krusoe, Jim. Girl Factory (2008). 
 Lawrence, Sarahlee. River House (2007). 
 Lemon, Alex. Mosquito (2006). 
 Matheson, Michele. Saving Angelfish (2006). 
 McCormack, Win. You Don't Know Me: A Citizen's Guide to Republican Family Values (2008). 
 Michaels, Sean. Us Conductors (2014).
 Montgomery, Lee and Tony Perez, eds. "The Writer's Notebook" (2009). 
 Morris, Keith Lee. Call It What You Want (2010). 
 Morris, Keith Lee. The Dart League King (2008). 
 Nevai, Lucia. Salvation (2008). 
 Otis, Mary. Yes, Yes Cherries (2007) 
 Parker, Jeff, Mikhail Iossel, eds. Francine Prose, intro.  "Rasskazy: New Fiction from a New Russia" (2009). 
 Parker, Jeff. Ovenman (2007). 
 Pashley, Jennifer. The Scamp (2015). 
 Pico, Tommy. Nature Poem (2017). 
 Shaughnessy, Brenda and C. J. Evans, eds. "Satellite Convulsions: Poems from Tin House" (2008). 
 Smith, Robert Paul, illustrated by Smith, Elinor Goulding. How to Do Nothing with Nobody All Alone by Yourself (2010). 
 Smith, Zak. Pictures Showing What Happens on Each Page of Thomas Pynchon's Novel Gravity's Rainbow (2006). 
 Smith, Zak. "We Did Porn" (2009). 
 Sparling, Scott. Wire to Wire (2011). 
 Specktor, Matthew. American Dream Machine (2012). 978-1935639442
 Taylor, Kimball. The Coyote's Bicycle (2016). 
 van Niekerk, Marlene. Agaat (2010). 
 Vanasco, Jeanie. The Glass Eye (2017). 
 Watson, Jan Elizabeth. "Asta in the Wings" (2009).

See also
List of literary magazines

References

External links
 Tin House (official website)

1998 establishments in Oregon
2019 disestablishments in Oregon
Defunct literary magazines published in the United States
Magazines disestablished in 2019
Magazines established in 1998
Magazines published in New York City
Magazines published in Portland, Oregon
Quarterly magazines published in the United States